The Intermediate Ring Road are roads identified as the main connecting roads between various radial roads in Hyderabad, Telangana, India. It complements the inner and outer ring roads, acting as a bypass, when traveling from one end of the city to the other, helping reduce travel time.

Intermediate Ring Roads

Intermediate ring roads in Hyderabad

See also 

Unified Metropolitan Transportation Authority, Hyderabad (India)
Inner Ring Road, Hyderabad
Radial Roads, Hyderabad (India)
Elevated Expressways in Hyderabad
Intermediate Ring Road, Hyderabad (India)
Outer Ring Road, Hyderabad
Regional Ring Road

References

Roads in Hyderabad, India
Ring roads in India